Adrian Michael Smith (born December 19, 1970) is an American politician serving as the U.S. representative for  since 2007. A member of the Republican Party, he represented the 48th district in the Nebraska Legislature from 1999 to 2007. Smith is the dean of Nebraska's congressional delegation.

Early life and education
Smith was born in Scottsbluff, Nebraska, and at a young age moved with his family to a rural neighborhood south of Gering, Nebraska. After graduating from Gering High School in 1989, he attended Liberty University. He transferred to the University of Nebraska–Lincoln midway through his second year of college, graduating in 1993. While a student at Nebraska, he interned in the Nebraska Governor's Office and, later, served as a legislative page in the Nebraska Legislature.

Early career 
Smith returned to Gering after college, and in 1994 began serving as a member of the Gering City Council. He has also worked in the private sector as a realtor and marketing specialist for the housing industry.

Nebraska Legislature

Elections 
In 1998, Smith defeated incumbent State Legislator Joyce Hillman 55%–45%. In 2002, he was reelected to a second term unopposed. Since Nebraska voters passed Initiative Measure 415 in 2001, he was term-limited.

Committee assignments 
Smith sat on the Natural Resources and Building Maintenance committees and was vice chair of the Transportation and Telecommunications committee. He served as vice chair of the Military and Veterans’ Affairs Committee and chaired the Four State Legislative Conference in 2001.

U.S. House of Representatives

Elections

2006
Smith ran for the open seat in the 3rd district in the 2006 election. Three-term incumbent Tom Osborne gave up the seat to run for governor of Nebraska.

Smith won the Republican primary with 39% of the vote in a field of five candidates. He faced Democrat Scott Kleeb, a ranch hand and Yale graduate, in the general election.

About a third of the funding for Smith's campaign came from members of the Club for Growth, a fiscally conservative group that supports tax cuts, limited government, school choice, and eliminating agricultural subsidies and the US Department of Agriculture.

For a time, Smith was presumed to be a prohibitive favorite in this overwhelmingly Republican district. The 3rd is one of the most Republican districts in the nation; presidential and statewide candidates routinely win it with 70% or more of the vote. The 3rd is extremely difficult to campaign in and has few unifying influences. But Kleeb raised more money than any other Democrat had raised in the district in decades. Overall, the race was the most expensive in the district since it assumed its current configuration in 1963.

As the race become more competitive than expected, it received late national attention from the House campaign committees.

President George W. Bush made an appearance in the district two days before the election to campaign for Smith—a sign that the Republican party was concerned about its chances in what had long been presumed to be a very safe seat.

In the end, Smith won by 10 percentage points, taking 55% of the vote to Kleeb's 45%. This was the closest a Democrat had come to winning the district in 16 years; in 1990, Republican Bill Barrett defeated fellow Unicameral member Sandra Scofield by only 4,400 votes. It was also only the third time a Democrat had come reasonably close to winning this district in its current configuration; besides Barrett's narrow win in 1990, Virginia D. Smith won her first term by 737 votes in 1974.

Besides Bush's visit two days before the election, Smith likely rode the coattails of Governor Dave Heineman, who won many of the counties in the district with 80% or more of the vote in his bid for a full term.

2008
Smith won the primary with 87% of the vote. He was reelected to a second term, defeating Democratic nominee Jay Stoddard 77%–23%.

2010
Smith won the primary with 88% of the vote. He was reelected to a third term, defeating Democratic nominee Rebekah Davis 70%–18%.

2012
Smith won the Republican primary with 82% of the vote. He was reelected to a fourth term, defeating Democratic nominee Mark Sullivan 74%–26%.

2014
Smith won the Republican primary with 68% of the vote. He was reelected to a fifth term, defeating Democratic nominee Mark Sullivan a second time, 75%–25%.

2016
Smith was unopposed in the Republican primary and the general election.

2018
Smith was renominated with 66% of the vote. He was reelected to a seventh term, defeating Democratic nominee Paul Theobald 77%–23%.

2020
Smith won the Republican primary over four other candidates with 83% of the vote, and won the general election with 78% of the vote over Democratic nominee Mark Elworth, a marijuana legalization activist.

Tenure
In December 2020, Smith was one of 126 Republican members of the House of Representatives to sign an amicus brief in support of Texas v. Pennsylvania, a lawsuit filed at the United States Supreme Court contesting the results of the 2020 presidential election, in which Joe Biden defeated incumbent Donald Trump. The Supreme Court declined to hear the case on the basis that Texas lacked standing under Article III of the Constitution to challenge the results of an election held by another state.

House Speaker Nancy Pelosi issued a statement that called signing the amicus brief an act of "election subversion." She also reprimanded Smith and the other House members who supported the lawsuit: "The 126 Republican Members that signed onto this lawsuit brought dishonor to the House. Instead of upholding their oath to support and defend the Constitution, they chose to subvert the Constitution and undermine public trust in our sacred democratic institutions." New Jersey Representative Bill Pascrell, citing section three of the 14th Amendment, called for Pelosi to not seat Smith and the other Republicans who signed the brief supporting the suit, arguing that "the text of the 14th Amendment expressly forbids Members of Congress from engaging in rebellion against the United States. Trying to overturn a democratic election and install a dictator seems like a pretty clear example of that."

Committee assignments
 Committee on Ways and Means
 Subcommittee on Trade
 Subcommittee on Social Security
 Subcommittee on Health

Caucus memberships
Congressional Rural Caucus (co-chair)
Republican Study Committee
 Tea Party Caucus
 Congressional Constitution Caucus

References

External links

 Congressman Adrian Smith official U.S. House website
 Adrian Smith for Congress
 
 
 

|-

1970 births
21st-century American politicians
Activists from Nebraska
American evangelicals
Living people
Nebraska city council members
Republican Party Nebraska state senators
People from Gering, Nebraska
People from Scottsbluff, Nebraska
Republican Party members of the United States House of Representatives from Nebraska
Tea Party movement activists
University of Nebraska–Lincoln alumni